The Three Sisters is a 1930 American pre-Code film directed by Paul Sloane and starring Louise Dresser, Tom Patricola and Kenneth MacKenna. It was distributed by Fox Film Corporation five years before they would become Twentieth Century Fox. It is unknown whether a print of the film still exists.

Cast
Louise Dresser as Marta
Tom Patricola as Tony
Kenneth MacKenna as Count d'Amati
Joyce Compton as Carlotta
June Collyer as Elena
Addie McPhail as Antonia
Sidney De Gray as Tito
John St. Polis as Judge
Herman Bing as Von Kosch
Dickie Moore (uncredited role as a child)

References

External links
 
 

1930 films
American black-and-white films
Fox Film films
1930 drama films
American drama films
Films directed by Paul Sloane
1930s American films